Maurice Fletcher Tremlett (5 July 1923 – 30 July 1984) was an English cricketer, who played for Somerset, Central Districts and England.

For a couple of years in the late 1940s, Tremlett looked as though he might be the answer to some of England's post-war cricketing woes. A tall, curly-haired all-rounder, Tremlett had a whippy fast-medium bowling action that moved the ball off the pitch and was a pugnacious right-handed batsman, strong at driving.

Life and career
Tremlett was born in Stockport, Cheshire.

His first-class debut was sensational. Having been on the Somerset staff since before World War II, he was finally picked for the first game of the 1947 season, at Lord's against Middlesex, the team that would dominate that season's County Championship. Tremlett took three wickets in the first innings, and then five in the space of five overs in the second, to finish with match figures of 8 for 86. He then followed that up by making an undefeated 19, and sharing in a last-wicket partnership that enabled Somerset to win the match by one wicket.

By the end of that first season, Tremlett had 656 runs and 65 wickets and he was chosen, with several other young cricketers, for the Marylebone Cricket Club (MCC) tour to the West Indies, where he opened the bowling in three of the four Test matches. He was not a success, taking only four wickets and scoring just 20 runs in the Tests, and on the tour as a whole, his wickets were expensive and he scored few runs.
Yet after another successful county season in 1948 – 1056 runs and 86 wickets, both at an improved average – he was picked for a second MCC tour in 1948–49, this time to South Africa. Though he scored his maiden century in the match against a Natal side at Pietermaritzburg, Tremlett was never in contention for a Test place and Wisdens report on the tour said that his "bowling lacked control".
After playing in South Africa, he was later one of many signatories in a letter to The Times on 17 July 1958 opposing 'the policy of apartheid' in international sport and defending 'the principle of racial equality which is embodied in the Declaration of the Olympic Games'.

Over the next few years, Tremlett's batting developed to the point where, in 1951, he scored more than 2,000 runs. In all, he scored 1,000 runs in a season ten times. But his bowling became more and more erratic until, by the mid-1950s, he was used only as an occasional change bowler. From 1956, he captained Somerset, their first professional skipper, charged with the job of restoring the fortunes of a county that had finished bottom of the Championship table for each of the preceding four seasons. As a captain, he was a great success, leading the side in 1958 to third position in the Championship, its highest placing ever. He stood down from the captaincy after the 1959 season and, after a few games in 1960, he retired to a job with Guinness.

His son, Tim Tremlett, was a fast-medium bowler for Hampshire in the 1970s and 1980s, and later the county's coach. Tim's son (and Maurice's grandson), Chris Tremlett, also a fast-medium bowler for Hampshire and later for Surrey, played for England in Tests and One Day Internationals.

Maurice Tremlett died in Southampton in 1984, at the age of 61.

References

 Brown, Geoff and Hogsbjerg, Christian. Apartheid is not a Game: Remembering the Stop the Seventy Tour campaign. London: Redwords, 2020. .

External links

1923 births
1984 deaths
English cricketers
England Test cricketers
Somerset cricket captains
Central Districts cricketers
Sportspeople from Stockport
Marylebone Cricket Club cricketers
West of England cricketers
North v South cricketers
Marylebone Cricket Club South African Touring Team cricketers